Zanclognatha cruralis, the early zanclognatha, is a species of litter moth of the family Erebidae. It is found from Wisconsin east through southern Canada, south to Florida and Texas.

The wingspan is 28–30 mm. Adults are on wing from April to July. There are two generations per year in the south.

Larvae have been recorded on beech, hazel, hemlock, maple, nettle and red spruce. Larvae have been reared on dead oak leaves.

External links
Images
Bug Guide

cruralis
Moths of North America
Moths described in 1854